Marina Josephine Khan (born 13 December 1965 in Te Puke, New Zealand) is a lawn bowls competitor for New Zealand.

Personal life
She is of Pakistani descent through her father, and of Yugoslav and Maori descent through her mother. Both she and her sister Jan Khan are the daughters of lawn bowler Millie Khan.

Bowls career
At the 2006 Commonwealth Games she won a bronze medal in the women's pairs event with her sister Jan Khan.

She won the fours gold medal and triples silver medal at the 2007 Asia Pacific Bowls Championships in Christchurch.

Marina won the 2000 pairs title and the 2001 & 2002 fours title at the New Zealand National Bowls Championships when bowling for the Matamata Bowls Club.

References

Living people
1965 births
New Zealand female bowls players
Commonwealth Games bronze medallists for New Zealand
Bowls players at the 2006 Commonwealth Games
People from Te Puke
New Zealand people of Pakistani descent
New Zealand people of Yugoslav descent
New Zealand Māori sportspeople
Commonwealth Games medallists in lawn bowls
Sportspeople from the Bay of Plenty Region
Medallists at the 2006 Commonwealth Games